2018 Emmy Awards may refer to:

 70th Primetime Emmy Awards, the 2018 Emmy Awards ceremony honoring primetime programming during June 2017 – May 2018
 45th Daytime Emmy Awards, the 2018 Emmy Awards ceremony honoring daytime programming during 2017
 46th International Emmy Awards, the 2018 ceremony honoring international programming

Emmy Award ceremonies by year